Green Imagination is a 2004 studio album by The Sunshine Fix. In style, often compared with mid-period Beatles and their contemporaries.

Track listing
All songs written by Bill Doss
 "Statues and Glue" – 1:56
 "What Do You Know" – 3:44
 "Extraordinary/Ordinary" – 2:27
 "Papers Fall" – 4:25
 "Innerstates" – 2:45
 "Rx" – 5:41
 "Afterglow" – 2:48
 "Enjoy the Teeth" – 5:09
 "Face the Ghost" – 2:39
 "Runaway Run" – 4:44
 "Sunday Afternoon" – 4:45

The music video for "Enjoy the Teeth" is included as an extra on the CD.

References

2004 albums
The Sunshine Fix albums
SpinART Records albums